Aqa Mirlu may refer to:
 Aqa Mirlu, Ardabil
 Aqamirlu, Kaleybar, East Azerbaijan Province
 Aqa Mirlu, Khoda Afarin, East Azerbaijan Province